Sheridan is an unincorporated community in Douglas County, Nevada, United States.

History 
The community was founded by Moses Job in the 1850s.

In 1861, there was a blacksmith shop, a store, a boarding house, and two saloons in the community.

References

Unincorporated communities in Douglas County, Nevada
Unincorporated communities in Nevada